Clayton is a town in northern Pushmataha County, Oklahoma, United States. The population was 821 at the 2010 census.

History 

Clayton was formerly known as Dexter. A United States Post Office was established at Dexter, Indian Territory on March 31, 1894 and was named for Dexter Chapman, early-day resident.

Dexter was located in Wade County, Choctaw Nation.
  
The official name of the post office name changed to Clayton, Indian Territory on April 5, 1907. Its name is thought to have been derived from Clayton, Missouri. It is also possible the town renamed itself after William H.H. Clayton, judge of the U.S. Court for the Central District of Indian Territory. Judge Clayton was prominent in the role to gain Oklahoma’s statehood.

Clayton is the largest town or community in northern Pushmataha County. It is the region's largest trading center due to its relative distance from the county seat of Antlers—36 miles.

Flagpole Mountain retains a fire tower. Built of metal and several stories tall, it was once part of a network of towers, all staffed, from which a fire watch was maintained. It is the only tower remaining in Pushmataha County, although it is no longer operational. Views from the tower offer a panorama stretching for many miles in any direction.

Clayton, as regional trading center, remains economically healthy, with a locally based economy. It is currently home to a public school, several churches, and numerous businesses and homes.

During recent years the Clayton High School has become recognized as an architecturally and historically significant building, and has been added to the NRHP. The building was found to be a very unusual example of WPA architecture—one of only two known single-use auditoriums constructed by the WPA.

On February 13, 2015, approximately 5% of the town population was arrested in a methamphetamine drug sweep.

More information on the history of Clayton may be found in the Pushmataha County Historical Society.

Geography
Clayton is located at  (34.587698, -95.357077).

Using the Public Land Survey System in use in Oklahoma the community is located in T6-1N-R19E.

Clayton, located in the Kiamichi River valley, is framed on its west by Flagpole Mountain (1,562 ft.) and to its east by unnamed mountains topping 1,600 feet in elevation. Within a few miles of Clayton is scenic McKinley Rocks, a collection of massive boulders strewn across a mountain top. South of Clayton is Clayton Lake State Park—which is surrounded by a pine tree forest—and northwest of town is Sardis Lake, a U.S. Army Corps of Engineers dam which impounds the water of Jack's Fork Creek. The Pushmataha Wildlife Refuge is also nearby, featuring scenic views from its mountain summit.

Utilities 
 Telephone, Internet, and Digital TV Services is provided by Hilliary Communications.

Demographics

As of the census of 2000, there were 719 people, 335 households, and 191 families residing in the town. There were 404 housing units at an average density of 238.3 per square mile (91.8/km2). The racial makeup of the town was 74.41% White, 19.33% Native American, and 6.26% from two or more races. Hispanic or Latino of any race were 0.70% of the population.

There were 335 households, out of which 28.4% had children under the age of 18 living with them, 41.8% were married couples living together, 12.8% had a female householder with no husband present, and 42.7% were non-families. 40.0% of all households were made up of individuals, and 22.7% had someone living alone who was 65 years of age or older.  The average household size was 2.15 and the average family size was 2.88.

In the town, the population was spread out, with 25.3% under the age of 18, 7.9% from 18 to 24, 23.8% from 25 to 44, 22.9% from 45 to 64, and 20.0% who were 65 years of age or older.  The median age was 38 years. For every 100 females, there were 83.0 males.  For every 100 females age 18 and over, there were 77.8 males.

The median income for a household in the town was $23,516, and the median income for a family was $23,009. Males had a median income of $13,750 versus $17,556 for females. The per capita income for the town was $13,530.  Below the poverty line were 8.8% of people, 31.3% of families, 49.4% of those under 18 and 37.0% of those over 64.

References

External links
 Encyclopedia of Oklahoma History and Culture - Clayton

Towns in Pushmataha County, Oklahoma
Towns in Oklahoma